Michael Badgley (born July 28, 1995), nicknamed "The Money Badger", is an American football placekicker for the Detroit Lions of the National Football League (NFL). He played college football at Miami (FL), and was signed as an undrafted free agent by the Colts in 2018. He has also played for the Los Angeles Chargers, Indianapolis Colts, Chicago Bears, and Tennessee Titans.

Early life and education
Born and raised in Summit, New Jersey to parents Chris and Leanne Badgley, Badgley attended Summit High School, where he played hockey and lacrosse, in addition to football. Badgley won at least one state championship in every sport he played in high school including consecutive group NJSIAA state lacrosse championships in 2010-2011 and a NJSIAA state hockey championship at the Prudential Center in 2012. Badgley had planned to play collegiate lacrosse and follow his older brother's footsteps until a coach convinced him that he could play football at the Division I level. Michael's older brother, Peter Badgley, is a former Division I lacrosse goalie at Providence College competing in the Big East Conference where he was selected first-team and Big East Goalie of the year in 2015.

Summit High School
In addition to kicking for Summit, Michael started on both sides of the ball at DB and RB, he returned kicks, punts and filled in at QB due to injuries to starting QB and completed 18 of 33 passes with 7 TD passes for 448 yards. He set 12 Summit HS football records for the Summit Hilltoppers, including longest field goal of 49 yards, most kicking points in season with 84, most consecutive PATs with 67, most kicking points in career with 202. Scored in record 34 consecutive games for Summit with career total of 389 points, second to Willie Wilson’s (Kansas City Royals) 401 career all-time points scored for Summit, including record 181 total points scored in senior season. Career totals include: 3,198 total all-purpose yards, 1,320 rushing yards, 607 receiving yards, 1,271 return yards. Scored 31 TDs including 17 rushing, seven receiving, two by kickoff returns, four by punt returns and one pick-6. Varsity team captain, leading Summit to 12–0 season and N.J. State Football Championship at MetLife Stadium in 2012 playing for head coach John Liberato. Michael was selected as the Star-Ledger Player of the Year in Union County in 2012 and the Maxwell Football Club’s Top 50 players in NJ.

Fork Union Military Academy
After Summit he attended Fork Union Military Academy’s post-graduate program playing for head coach Col. John Shuman. At FUMA he was on the Dean's list and was No. 1 Ranked kicker in 247Sports Composite Rankings. His longest field goal at Fork Union Military Academy was 58 yards. Fork Union Military Academy School also produced former NFL players Vinny Testaverde and Eddie George.

College career

Badgley attended and played college football at the University of Miami in Coral Gables, FL. Badgley is Miami's all-time leading scorer and was a 2017 all-ACC, first teamer. At the University of Miami, Badgley was named Team Captain, First Team All-ACC, Lou Groza Semi-Finalist, Walter Kichefski Award recipient and U of Miami Special Teams MVP in 2017. Michael was the Miami Hurricanes starting kicker as a true freshman in 2014 through his senior season in 2017, leaving Miami with six school records including the all-time leading scorer at The U.  In 2015, Badgley was selected by Pro Football Focus as a First Team All-American. After graduating, Michael was invited to both the Reese's Senior Bowl in Mobile, AL and the NFL Scouting Combine in Indianapolis, IN.

University of Miami Hurricane Football Team Records:

 Career Points scored: 1st- Michael Badgley 403;
 Career FGs: 1st- Michael Badgley 77;
 FGs Season: 1st- Michael Badgley 25 (2015);
 FG Attempts Season: 1st- Michael Badgley 30 (2015);
 FGs Game: (Tie) 1st- Michael Badgley 5 (Nebraska 2015, Pittsburgh 2015), Jon Peattie 5 (West Virginia 2003);
 Longest FG: (Tie) 1st- Michael Badgley 57 (Georgia Tech 2015), Danny Miller 57 (Florida State 1981).

Collegiate statistics

Professional career

Indianapolis Colts
After not being selected in the 2018 NFL Draft, Badgley signed with the Indianapolis Colts as an undrafted free agent. Badgley worked with kicker Adam Vinatieri during the pre-season with the Colts. Vinateri said "He's a good kid, and he's a really good kicker as well, He's got a nice leg and he's doing a good job picking my brain. We joke around that he's always kind of in my back pocket all the time, and rightfully so." The Colts ended up releasing Badgley before the start of the regular season in favor of Adam Vinatieri, but not before he had connected on all 5 of his field goal attempts in the preseason, with a long of 51 yards. On September 1, 2018, Badgley was waived by the Colts as part of the final roster cuts.

Los Angeles Chargers
Badgley was signed by the Los Angeles Chargers on October 11, 2018. In Week 6, he made his NFL debut against the Cleveland Browns. In the 38–14 victory, he converted all five extra point attempts and his one field goal attempt. In the next game, a 20–19 victory over the Tennessee Titans, he converted two field goal attempts and two extra point attempts. In Week 13, against the Pittsburgh Steelers on Sunday Night Football, Badgley missed a 52-yard try on the game's first possession. He rebounded from it to hit both his extra point tries, and then, after missing one attempt and having one blocked—both negated by defensive offside penalties—he hit the game-winner from 29 yards out to give the Chargers a 33–30 win. The following week against Cincinnati, Badgley hit four field goals from 59, 31, 32, and 46 yards during a 26–21 win. The 59-yarder set a Chargers franchise record for longest field goal. He was named AFC Special Teams Player of the Week for his performance. During the 2018 AFC Wildcard matchup against the Baltimore Ravens, Badgley went 4/4 from field goal range in the first half, becoming only the third kicker to do so. The Chargers went on to beat the Ravens with a final score of 23–17,  he rewrote the record books with the most field goals (five) and points (15) in a postseason game in Chargers history. Badgley was the league's top special teams rookie for the 2018 season.

At the completion of the 2020 season, his first complete season, and third season overall with the Chargers, Badgley became the 19th leading scorer in team history with a total of 238 points scored in regular season games played for the Chargers. He passed Josh Lambo at 20th on the list with 226 points scored to break into the top 20 total career points scored. Michael also entered the top ten in field goals made in a career to tie Josh Lambo at 6th all-time with 52 made in regular seasons games played. The Chargers finished the 2020 season winning the final four games with Badgley hitting two game winners for the Bolts down the home stretch. In week 14 the Los Angeles Chargers improved to 4-9 on the season after a 20-17 win over the Atlanta Falcons (Dec. 13). On the final drive with 00:16 seconds left in the game Badgley came on to attempt a 43-yard field goal and it was good to give the Bolts the win over the Falcons. In week 16 the Los Angeles Chargers improve to 6-9 on the season after a 19-16 win over the Denver Broncos (December 27). Badgley came on and made a 37-yard field goal to make it 19-16 in favor of the home team with 00:41 seconds left on the clock.

Tennessee Titans
On September 10, 2021, Badgley was signed by the Tennessee Titans to their practice squad as a replacement for injured kicker Sam Ficken, and promoted to the active roster a day later. He was waived the next day on September 13, 2021.

Indianapolis Colts (second stint)
On October 14, 2021, Badgley signed with the Indianapolis Colts practice squad. On October 16, he was elevated to the active roster following an injury to starting kicker Rodrigo Blankenship, and officially signed to the roster after making all five of his kicks in Week 6. The Colts would be eliminated from the playoffs following a surprising 26-11 Week 18 defeat against the Jacksonville Jaguars and the Pittsburgh Steelers beating the Baltimore Ravens later in the day. Badgley finished the season making 18 of 21 field goals and 39 of 39 extra points.

Chicago Bears
On October 1, 2022, the Chicago Bears signed Badgley to their practice squad. He was elevated to the active roster for the team's game against the New York Giants due to kicker Cairo Santos being questionable for personal reasons. He made all four field goals he attempted during the game. He was released two days later.

Detroit Lions
On October 5, 2022, Badgley was signed to the Detroit Lions practice squad. He was promoted to the active roster on October 29. He finished the season by making 24 of 28 (85.7 pct.) field goals attempts and was a perfect 33 of 33 (100 pct.) on his extra point attempts. He was named NFC Special Teams Player of the Week in Week 13 after scoring 16 points on four extra points and four field goals in a 40-14 win over the Jacksonville Jaguars. He was one of six Detroit Lions to with a NFC position player of the week award honors joining safety Kerby Joseph, pass rusher Aidan Hutchinson, receiver Amon-Ra St. Brown, return man Kalif Raymond, and running back Jamaal Williams.

NFL career statistics

Records
Los Angeles Chargers Franchise Records:

Single-Season Field goal percentage: 93.8 Percent (2018 Season)
Longest Field Goal: 59 Yards (vs.Cincinnati 2018 Season)
Field Goals Made Post-Season Game: 5 (Wild Card Game vs. Ravens, 2018 Season )
Points Scored Post-Season Game: 15 (2018 Wild Card Game vs. Ravens, 2018 Season)

References

External links
Miami Hurricanes bio
Los Angeles Chargers bio

1995 births
Living people
American football placekickers
Summit High School (New Jersey) alumni
Sportspeople from Summit, New Jersey
Players of American football from New Jersey
Miami Hurricanes football players
Indianapolis Colts players
Los Angeles Chargers players
Tennessee Titans players
Chicago Bears players
Detroit Lions players